Çifteköprü is a village in the Borçka District, Artvin Province, Turkey. Its population is 261 (2021).

History 
According to list of villages in Laz language book (2009), name of the village is Jurxinci, which means "double bridge". Most villagers are ethnically Laz.

References

Villages in Borçka District
Laz settlements in Turkey